Abitibi—Baie-James—Nunavik—Eeyou (formerly known as Abitibi, Abitibi—Baie-James—Nunavik, and Nunavik—Eeyou) is a federal riding in the province of Quebec, Canada, that have been represented in the House of Commons of Canada since 1966.

"Abitibi" was created in 1966, and renamed "Abitibi—Baie-James—Nunavik". It was abolished in 2003, and most of its territory was incorporated into "Nunavik—Eeyou", which was renamed "Abitibi—Baie-James—Nunavik—Eeyou" in 2004.

Geography
Abitibi—Baie-James—Nunavik—Eeyou consists of:
 the Vallée-de-l'Or Regional County Municipality (population 2016: 43,226), including: Lac-Simon Indian Reserve; the Indian Settlement of Grand-Lac Victoria;
Nord-du-Québec 
(Population 2016: 44,561)
 the Territory of Eeyou Istchee James Bay Regional Government, including: the Cree villages and reserved lands of Whapmagoostui, Chisasibi, Eastmain, Mistissini, Nemiscau, Waskaganish, Waswanipi and Wemindji; the Indian Settlement of Oujé-Bougoumou, excepting that part of the Municipality of Baie-James lying southerly of latitude 50°00′ N and westerly of longitude 79°00′ W; and
 the Territory of the Kativik Regional Government, including the Nordic village municipalities of Akulivik, Aupaluk, Inukjuak, Ivujivik, Kangiqsualujjuaq, Kangiqsujuaq, Kangirsuk, Kuujjuaq, Kuujjuarapik, Puvirnituq, Quaqtaq, Salluit, Tasiujaq and Umiujaq; the Naskapi Village Municipality of Kawawachikamach.

The neighbouring ridings are Timmins—James Bay, Nunavut, Labrador, Manicouagan, Chicoutimi—Le Fjord, Roberval—Lac-Saint-Jean, Saint-Maurice—Champlain, Pontiac and Abitibi—Témiscamingue.

Abitibi—Baie-James—Nunavik—Eeyou contains more than half of Quebec's total landmass. As such, it is the largest riding in a Canadian province and the third largest in the country after the territorial ridings of Nunavut and Northwest Territories.

Demographics
According to the Canada 2016 Census

 Languages: (2016) 63.0% French, 17.7% Cree, 13.4% Inuktitut, 3.7% English, 0.8% Algonquin, 0.3% Spanish, 0.2% Arabic, 0.1% Polish, 0.1% Lao, 0.1% Atikamekw

History
Abitibi riding was created in 1966 from parts of Chapleau and Saguenay electoral districts. In 1976, parts of Villeneuve were incorporated. The electoral district's name was changed in 1998 to "Abitibi—Baie-James—Nunavik".

In the 2003 re-distribution, Abitibi—Baie-James—Nunavik was abolished. A new riding, "Nunavik—Eeyou", was created with substatilly the same territory as Abitibi—Baie-James—Nunavik. Parts of Manicouagan and Roberval ridings were added, while a part was lost to Abitibi—Témiscamingue. Its name was changed to "Abitibi—Baie-James—Nunavik—Eeyou" after the 2004 election.

The 2012 electoral redistribution saw this riding gain a small territory from Abitibi—Témiscamingue.

Riding associations

Riding associations are the local branches of political parties:

Members of Parliament

This riding has elected the following Members of Parliament:

Election results

Abitibi—Baie-James—Nunavik—Eeyou, 2004–present

|align="left" colspan=2|New Democratic Party gain from Bloc Québécois
|align="right"|Swing
|align="right"| +29.11
|align="right"|

Source: Elections Canada
Source: The Gazette Popular Cree leader running for NDP
Source: Nunatsiaq News Nunavik voters face two ballots in one week

|-

|-

Nunavik—Eeyou, 2003–2004

Note: Conservative vote is compared to the total of the Canadian Alliance vote and Progressive Conservative vote in 2000 election.

Abitibi—Baie-James—Nunavik, 2000–2004

Abitibi, 1968–2000

	

	

Note: Social Credit vote is compared to Ralliement créditiste vote in the 1968 election.

See also
 List of Canadian federal electoral districts
 Past Canadian electoral districts

References

Campaign expense data from Elections Canada
Riding history from the Library of Parliament:
Nunavik—Eeyou, 2003–2004
Abitibi—Baie-James—Nunavik—Eeyou, 2004–present
Riding history for Abitibi from the Library of Parliament
Riding history for Abitibi—Baie-James—Nunavik from the Library of Parliament

Notes

Quebec federal electoral districts
Chibougamau
Val-d'Or